Medicine Show Man, subtitled Pink Anderson Vol. 2, is an album by blues musician Pink Anderson recorded in 1961 and released on the Bluesville label the following year.

Reception

AllMusic reviewer Richie Unterberger stated: "it seems that Anderson sounds a bit more comfortable in the studio/recording setting on this one than on the others, and a tad less countrified and more urbane. The tone is cheerful and easygoing, like that of a well-loved man entertaining his neighbors. Which is not to say this is a throwaway; the phrasing and rhythms are crisp, and the ragtime-speckled folk/blues guitar accomplished". Roland Ellis of Gaslight Records said "Plain old pastoral blues is what it's all about here. Pink Anderson's Vol 2. Medicine Show Man sees travelin' folk fused with traditional blues in order to tell simple stories about lower class life in the southern United States and yep that's pretty much it. Relentlessly circular blues patterns. Twee, surface scratching lyrics. One guitar and one vocal and one unwaveringly steady dynamic. Light hearted blues might be paradoxical, but that's how this record could perhaps best be described ... Pink Anderson's Vol 2. Medicine Show Man albeit interesting from a socio-cultural perspective, really does lack that depth and backbone required to make a record feel memorable and timeless".

Track listing
All compositions are uncredited traditional blues
 "I Got Mine" – 3:37
 "Greasy Greens" – 4:34
 "I Got a Woman 'Way Cross Town" – 2:58
 "Travelin' Man" – 4:35
 "Ain't Nobody Home But Me" – 4:12
 "That's No Way to Do" – 2:26
 "In the Jailhouse Now" – 4:32
 "South Forest Boogie" – 3:57
 "Chicken" – 4:10
 "I'm Going to Walk Through the Streets of the City" – 2:56

Personnel

Performance
Pink Anderson – guitar, vocals

Production
 Kenneth S. Goldstein – producer
 Samuel Charters – engineer

References

Pink Anderson albums
1962 albums
Bluesville Records albums